The Krehberg is a  high hill in the Odenwald,  west of Lindenfels.

Hills of Hesse